Bernhard von Kugler (14 June 1837, Berlin – 7 April 1898, Tübingen) was a German historian. He is largely known for his research of the Crusades.

He studied at the Universities of Greifswald, Tübingen and Munich, obtaining his habilitation in history at University of Munich  in 1861. Later, he became an associate professor (1867) and a full professor of history (1874) at the University of Tübingen.

He was the son of art historian Franz Theodor Kugler (1808–1858).

Published works 
 Boemund und Tankred, Fürsten von Antiochien : ein Beitrag zur Geschichte der Normannen in Syrien, 1862 – Bohemond and Tancred, prince of Antioch : a contribution to the history of the Normans in Syria.  
 Ulrich Herzog zu Wirtemberg, 1865 – Ulrich, Duke of Württemberg.
 Studien zur Geschichte des zweiten Kreuzzuges, 1866 – Studies involving the history of the Second Crusade. 
 Christoph, Herzog zu Wirtemberg (two volumes 1868, 1872) – Christoph, Duke of Württemberg.
 Analecten zur Geschichte des zweiten Kreuzzugs. 1878 - Selections from the history of the Second Crusade. 
 Geschichte der Kreuzzüge, 1880 – History of the Crusades.
 Neue Analecten zur Geschichte des zweiten Kreuzzuges, 1883 - New selections from the history of the Second Crusade.
 Albert von Aachen  1885 – Albert of Aix.

References 

1837 births
1898 deaths
Writers from Berlin
Academic staff of the University of Tübingen
19th-century German historians
19th-century German male writers
19th-century German writers
German male non-fiction writers